The agoutis of the genus Dasyprocta are locally known as "cutias". See also Hutia, where the name for these rodents originated.

The cutias are the passerine bird genus Cutia in the family Leiothrichidae. These birds are found in montane forests of continental South and Southeast Asia. The name is derived from the Nepali name  khatya or khutya for the type species, the Himalayan cutia (C. nipalensis). The cutias are related to the alcippes and the laughingthrushes.

Species
For a long time the genus was held to be monotypic, containing only a single species C. nipalensis. This has more recently been split in two:

References

 Collar, N.J. & Robson, Craig (2007): Family Timaliidae (Babblers). In: del Hoyo, Josep; Elliott, Andrew & Christie, D.A. (eds.): Handbook of Birds of the World, Volume 12 (Picathartes to Tits and Chickadees): 70-291. Lynx Edicions, Barcelona.
 Pittie, Aasheesh (2004): A dictionary of scientific bird names originating from the Indian region. Buceros: ENVIS Newsletter Avian Ecology & Inland Wetlands 9(2): 1-30. PDF fulltext

 
Bird genera
Leiothrichidae
 
Taxonomy articles created by Polbot